Stelio Savante is a South African American actor, filmmaker and producer  known for his roles as a South African journalist and undercover Mossad agent opposite Jim Caviezel and Claudia Karvan in the political thriller Infidel, a Portuguese mayor opposite Matt Dillon in the Hawaiian drama Running for Grace, a rogue policeman in the South African epic drama Colors of Heaven, and a small town deputy directly opposite Cress Williams, Kellan Lutz and Anne Heche, in her final film performance in the noir What Remains. In 2007 he became the first male South African-born Screen Actors Guild award nominee (Best Ensemble in a Comedy) for his recurring role on Ugly Betty followed by  roles in the studio films My Super Ex-Girlfriend and Starship Troopers 3: Marauder. He is also known for the roles of Moses in the biblical series The Chosen, and the voice of Ajax in the popular video games Call of Duty: Black Ops 4 and Call of Duty: Mobile.

Early life
A Capetonian of Greek, Italian, British, Ashkenazi, and Anatolian descent, his grandfather was a racing driver who placed and won medals at the 1955 Monte Carlo Rally. Fluent in Afrikaans and Greek, he graduated from Camps Bay High School, immigrated from South Africa to the United States when he was offered an international tennis scholarship by the University of West Alabama and relocated again to New York City in 1992 to pursue an acting career.

New York
His prime-time debut came in Law & Order: Special Victims Unit as a Bosnian–Muslim fundamentalist. Directed by Academy Award winner Juan Jose Campanella and also starring Bradley Cooper and Alfred Molina, the episode was nominated for an Emmy. Further television credits include Law & Order: Criminal Intent opposite Chris Noth and Annabella Sciorra, The Sopranos, Guiding Light, All My Children, as Dan 'Schaffy' Schaffner in Jim Breuer's pilot for Pulp Comics on Comedy Central and recurring as Antonio on Late Night with Conan O'Brien.

Film credits include the comedy My Super Ex-Girlfriend directed by Ivan Reitman, starring opposite Anna Faris, Eddie Izzard, Uma Thurman, Luke Wilson, and Rainn Wilson, and in Ron Howard's Academy Award winner A Beautiful Mind opposite Russell Crowe.

Theater credits include lead roles in the American and New York premiers of Arnie Sieren's award-winning Belgian play, My Blackie, Belgian playwright Jean-Yves Picq's The Case Of Kaspar Meyer, German playwright Roland Schimmelpfennig's Arabian Night directed by Trip Cullman, Dan Gordon's Murder in the First directed by American Theatre Wing alumni Michael Parva, and Mortal Coils directed by Actors Studio lifetime member Ed Setrakian.

Los Angeles
Savante relocated to Los Angeles in 2006 for recurring role of Steve on Ugly Betty, produced by Salma Hayek. He received a Screen Actor's Guild nomination along with the lead ensemble cast in 2007.

Savante's Los Angeles television credits also include a recurring role on My Own Worst Enemy, guest star lead roles in J. J. Abrams' Undercovers opposite Boris Kodjoe and Gugu Mbatha-Raw, The Suite Life on Deck, Person of Interest opposite Jim Caviezel, Without a Trace opposite Marianne Jean-Baptiste and Ivana Milicevic, Breakout Kings opposite Jimmi Simpson, and NCIS. He portrayed Joe Masseria in the eight part mini-series The Making of the Mob: New York for AMC and David Sarnoff in American Genius for National Geographic.

He received positive reviews for his role in the feature A Million Colours, which screened at the Montreal World Film Festival, Pan African Film Festival, Atlantic Film Festival, and was also awarded two South African Film and Television Awards.

His film credits include an ensemble leading role in Sony Pictures Entertainment Starship Troopers 3: Marauder produced by Academy Award nominee David Lancaster , a supporting role in Movieguide award winner What If, and a lead role opposite Isaach De Bankole and Juliet Landau in Rudolf Buitendach's Where the Road Runs Out, the first feature to ever be filmed in Equatorial Guinea, winner of the Best Narrative Feature Award at the 2014 San Diego Film Festival and a Black Reel Award for Outstanding World Cinema in 2017.

Savante starred in Peter Greenaway's Eisenstein in Guanajuato which was nominated for the Golden Bear at the 2015 Berlin International Film Festival. He also starred in the independent film Pacific Standard Time opposite Alex Russell and Willa Holland, as well as in the HBO series Togetherness directed by Mark Duplass and Jay Duplass, and the sex trafficking film Selling Isobel, winner of the 'Indie Award' at the Raindance Film Festival in 2016. He guest starred in The Chosen by Dallas Jenkins and on Tyler Perry's The Haves and the Have Nots.

Savante starred directly opposite Matt Dillon and Jim Caviezel in Running for Grace directed by David L. Cunningham, and opposite Michael Beach and George Blagden in the romantic comedy No Postage Necessary. He voiced the role of Ajax in Call of Duty: Black Ops 4. Savante was cast opposite Jim Caviezel for the third time, also working directly opposite Claudia Karvan in Cyrus Nowrasteh's political thriller Infidel which was released nationwide on 18 September 2020.

Films And Plays Produced
Savante has produced and served in a producing role on such films as No Postage Necessary, Official Selection of the Heartland Film Festival starring George Blagden, Michael Beach, and Raymond J. Barry making history as the first film to ever release via blockchain technology and available to stream using cryptocurrency as payment, religious film The Penitent Thief released by Vertical Entertainment, and drama Selling Isobel starring Lew Temple, Alyson Stoner, and Matthew Marsden, winner at the 2016 Raindance released by Gravitas Ventures, and several short films.

To commemorate the tenth anniversary of the September 11 attacks Stelio produced and performed 110 Stories Celebrity Benefit Performances with Katie Holmes, Samuel L. Jackson, Melissa Leo, Cynthia Nixon, and Jeremy Piven. at the Skirball Center for The Performing Arts at NYU.  It was directed by Gregory Mosher.  Savante describes 110 Stories as a chance to give people closure about the attacks; he was in New York City at the time of the attacks, and cites that as a reason why he produces the play.
In 2010, he also produced and performed the Los Angeles theater debut of 110 Stories Celebrity Benefit Performances at the Geffen Playhouse, with John Hawkes and Ed Asner directed by Mark Freiburger. All proceeds were donated to the Red Cross Los Angeles as aid to Haiti in the aftermath of their earthquake. In 2013, he produced and performed 110 Stories at Ebony Rep in Los Angeles. The proceeds were donated to Operation Gratitude. And again he produced and performed 110 Stories opposite Robert Forster and Mira Sorvino directed by his acting teacher Bill Alderson in 2016. As playwright, his one-act play Venom was self-produced Off Broadway and nominated as a finalist for Samuel French's Love Creek festival.

Video game credits include: Call of Duty: Black Ops 4 and Call of Duty: Mobile,Tom Clancy's Ghost Recon: Future Soldier, Uncharted 3: Drake's Deception, Mass Effect 2, Army of Two: The 40th Day, a role in the live-action simulated video game Red Alert 3, and Midnight Club.

Personal life
Savante was diagnosed with Celiac Disease in 2010 and has become a vocal advocate for other sufferers.  He stated that the disease attacked his organs, including his liver. He was later also diagnosed with Hashimoto's thyroiditis.

 Awards and nominations 

Best Actor – Once We Were Slaves – American Movie Awards (2015, Winner)
Best Male Performance Award – Once We Were Slaves – Attic Film Festival (2015, Nominee)
Best Actor in a Short Film –  Once We Were Slaves – Bare Bones International Film Festival (2015, Nominee)
Best Actor in a Short Film Award – Once We Were Slaves – International Christian Film Festival (2015, Nominee)
Best Narrative Feature Award & UTA Award shared with Rudolf Buitendach – Where The Road Runs Out'' – San Diego Film Festival (2014, Winner)

Selected filmography

References

External links
 
 
 Broadway World Coverage – "110 Stories Opening Night"
 USOPEN Interview – "Savante produces 9/11 History"
 A Million Colours Review – All About Mzansi

20th-century South African male actors
20th-century American male actors
21st-century South African male actors
21st-century American male actors
Male actors from Cape Town
South African dramatists and playwrights
South African emigrants to the United States
South African male film actors
South African male stage actors
South African male soap opera actors
South African male television actors
South African film producers
South African screenwriters
Film producers from New York (state)
American male film actors
American people of Greek descent
South African people of Greek descent
American male stage actors
American male soap opera actors
American male television actors
American male screenwriters
Living people
Male actors from New York City
White South African people
South African expatriates in the United States
Male dramatists and playwrights
People from Astoria, Queens
Screenwriters from New York (state)
American male video game actors
American male voice actors
Year of birth missing (living people)
Alumni of Camps Bay High School